Fajirabad (also Romanized as Fajirābād) is a village in Zavarom Rural District, in the Central District of Shirvan County, North Khorasan Province, Iran. At the 2006 census, its population was 746, in 188 families.

References 

Populated places in Shirvan County